Dutton Park railway station is located on the Beenleigh line in Queensland, Australia. It serves the Brisbane suburb of Dutton Park.  The station is one of the oldest on the network.

To the west of the station lies the NSW North Coast dual gauge line primarily used by Gold Coast, NSW TrainLink XPT and freight services.

History

Dutton Park station opened in 1884 as Boggo Junction. It was the junction of the Wooloongabba line from 1884 until 1989. It was renamed Dutton Park in 1914.

In September 1930, the standard gauge New South Wales North Coast line opened to the west of the station. In 1995, as part of the construction of the Gold Coast line, the standard gauge line was converted to dual gauge.

In early 2014, it was announced that Dutton Park would be closed if the Bus & Train Tunnel proceeded, because it would reduce the overall cost of the project, principally by ensuring that no surface-level private residential property acquisition would be required.

In June 2014, it was announced that by slightly increasing the gradient of the line, the project could proceed without the need to demolish Dutton Park station. The project was cancelled in March 2015.

Cross River Rail
The station is being relocated and receiving a major upgrade as part of Cross River Rail. The new station design has easier access for people using wheelchairs or walking frames, and parents with prams. New entry points to station will be built from Noble Street, Kent Street and Annerley Road.

Services
Dutton Park station is served by all stops Beenleigh line services from Beenleigh, Kuraby and Coopers Plains to Bowen Hills and Ferny Grove.

Until June 2011, Dutton Park was also served by services to Corinda via the Yeerongpilly-Corinda line.

Services by platform

References

External links

Dutton Park station Queensland Rail
Dutton Park station Queensland's Railways on the Internet

Dutton Park, Queensland
Railway stations in Brisbane
Railway stations in Australia opened in 1884